Michael or Mike McDonald may refer to:

Michael McDonald (musician) (born 1952), American blue-eyed soul singer
Mike McDonald (footballer) (born 1950), footballer for Stoke City and a number of Scottish clubs
Mike McDonald (American football) (born 1958), American football player
Michael McDonald (costume designer) (born c. 1963), American costume designer
Michael McDonald (comedian) (born 1964), American actor-comedian 
Michael McDonald (kickboxer) (born 1965), Canadian K-1 fighter
Michael McDonald (basketball) (born 1969), American basketball player
Michael McDonald (runner) (born 1975), Jamaican runner
Michael McDonald (poker player) (born 1989), Canadian poker player
Michael McDonald (MMA fighter) (born 1991), American mixed martial artist
Michael McDonald (rugby union) (born 1999), Australian rugby union player
Michael Cassius McDonald (1839–1907), American crime boss and political boss
Michael Phillip McDonald, Australian judge

See also
Michael MacDonald (disambiguation)